The Woman's Hour: The Great Fight to Win the Vote by Elaine Weiss is a 2018 non-fiction book about women's suffrage in the United States.

Upcoming television adaptation
A television drama series based upon the book was announced in October 2020. It is slated to be executive produced by Weiss and Hillary Clinton, as well as Darryl Frank and Justin Falvey of Amblin Television, and is slated to be overseen by Angelina Burnett. It is planned to air on The CW.

References

External links
Q&A interview with Weiss on The Woman's Hour, August 16, 2020, C-SPAN

2018 non-fiction books
Books about feminism
Literature about women's suffrage in the United States
Penguin Books books